Brothel is a 2008 film written and directed by Amy Waddell. The film stars Serena Scott Thomas, Brett Cullen, Timothy V. Murphy, and Bruce Payne. The film was filmed in Jerome and Clarkdale, Arizona.

Plot

A young couple bought an old house in Jerome which used to be a brothel. The husband commits suicide and the wife, Julianne (played by Serena Scott Thomas), attempts to come to terms with her loss and modernize the house. She 'finds the building is still inhabited by the ghosts of prostitutes' and 'that she is being stalked by Death himself (Bruce Payne)'.

Cast
 Serena Scott Thomas as Julianne
 Brett Cullen as Avery
 Bruce Payne as Thief/Death
 Grace Zabriskie as Madam Lady Sadie
 Timothy V. Murphy as Gayle/Brian
 Sarah Lassez as Sophie
 Andrea Morris as Maddy
 Lisa Banes as Priscilla
 Yvonne Scio as Maddy

Reception

John Reid, who reviewed the film for the Sedona Red Rock News, noted "the density of atmosphere and the intensity of the actors and crew palpable on the set". David Kanowsky, who reviewed the film for Kudos, stated that it was "a very fine ghost story without horror". A contributor to the Independent Film Quarterly described the film as "an erotic indie version of Inception." Steve Miller stated that Brothel "is a great haunted house movie that is rich in atmosphere from beginning to end, yet almost entirely free of elements that are typically associated with the horror genre – jump-scares, bloody gore, and characters doing stupid things just so the plot can keep moving." In his view, it is "a beautiful, well-acted film." Its rating on the Internet Movie Database is 3.6/10.

References

External links
 
 

2008 films
American drama films
2008 drama films
Films set in Arizona
Films scored by Anthony Marinelli
2000s English-language films
2000s American films